185th may refer to:

185th (2/1st West Riding) Brigade, formation of the Territorial Force of the British Army
185th Air Refueling Squadron flies the KC-135 Stratotanker
185th Air Refueling Wing (ARW), unit located at Sioux Gateway Airport, Iowa
185th Airborne Division Folgore, Parachute Division of the Italian Army during World War II
185th Armor Regiment (United States), consists of soldiers from the California Army National Guard
185th Aviation Brigade (United States), aviation brigade of the United States Army
185th Canadian Infantry Battalion (Cape Breton Highlanders), CEF, unit in the Canadian Expeditionary Force during the First World War
185th Fighter-Bomber Aviation Regiment, Mixed Aviation Regiment, part of the SFR Yugoslav Air Force
185th Infantry Brigade (United Kingdom), the codename of one of the five main landing beaches in the Allied invasion of Normandy in 1944
185th Infantry Regiment (United States), combat regiment of the United States Army made up of soldiers from the California Army National Guard
185th Ohio Infantry (or 185th OVI) was an infantry regiment in the Union Army during the American Civil War
185th Street (Manhattan)
Pennsylvania's 185th Representative District, electoral district of the Pennsylvania House of Representatives
Willow Creek / Southwest 185th Avenue Transit Center, light rail station and transit center on the MAX Blue Line in Hillsboro, Oregon, United States

See also
185 (number)
185, the year 185 (CLXXXV) of the Julian calendar
185 BC